The Apostolic Prefecture of Mardin (alias of Mesopotamia) was a relatively short-lived Latin missionary pre-diocesan jurisdiction with see in Mardian, in southern Asian Turkey.

History 
It was established on 1842.08.30 as Apostolic Prefecture of Mardin alias of Mesopotamia, on territory split off from the then Apostolic Prefecture of Syria and Cicilia, and run by Capuchin Friars Minor.

Circa 1909, it was suppressed without former successor jurisdiction.

Ordinaries 
(all Roman Rite, missionary members of a Latin congregation)
Apostolic Prefects of Mardin 
 Father Giuseppe da Burgos, Capuchin Franciscans (O.F.M. Cap.) (1842 – 1845)
 Nicola da Barcellona, O.F.M. Cap. (1845 – 1873)
 Donato da Guardiagrele, O.F.M. Cap. (1873 – 1879)
 Giovanni Antonio Zucchetti, O.F.M. Cap. (1879 – 1909.12.22), later Metropolitan Archbishop of Izmir (Smyrna, Asian Turkey) (1909.12.22 – 1920.03.08), emeritate as Titular Archbishop of Trapezus (1920.03.08 – death 1931.06.01)

See also
Roman Catholicism in Turkey

Source and External links 
 GCatholic with incumbent bio links

Apostolic prefectures
Former Roman Catholic dioceses in Asia